The Welsh Language Society (often abbreviated to Cymdeithas yr Iaith or just Cymdeithas) is a direct action pressure group in Wales campaigning for the right of Welsh people to use the Welsh language in every aspect of their lives.

The current Chair of Cymdeithas yr Iaith Gymraeg is Robat Idris.

History

1960s 

The Society was established in name on 4 August 1962 at Pontarddulais in South Wales, but did not have a constitution until 18 May 1963. The formation was at least partly inspired by the annual BBC Wales Radio Lecture given on 13 February 1962 by Saunders Lewis and entitled Tynged yr iaith (The fate of the language). Historian John Davies has said that the lecture was "the catalyst" for the formation of the Welsh Language Society,  and the start of a period of direct-action agitation to enhance the status of the Welsh language. Its direct effect on the formation of the Society is described in a history of that society.

The Society's first public protest took place in February 1963 in Aberystwyth town centre, where members pasted posters on the post office in an attempt to be arrested and go to trial. When it became apparent that they would not be arrested for the posters, they then moved to Pont Trefechan in Aberystwyth, where around seventy members and supporters held a sit-in blocking road traffic for half an hour.

The first campaigns were for official status for the language, with a call for Welsh-language tax returns, schools, electoral forms, post office signs, birth certificates and so on. This was done through the formation of 'cells', the first operating in Bangor in April 1963 by Owain Owain who also founded and edited the Society's only publication, Tafod y Ddraig ('The Dragon's Tongue') and designed the logo.

In 1968 a sit-in was held at the news and television studio and the newsroom department of the BBC at Broadway, Cardiff, by members of the Society. The sit-in was calling for the BBC to use more Welsh.

1970s and 1980s 

Cymdeithas yr Iaith believes in direct action, and in the course of its campaigns over a thousand people have appeared before the courts for their part in various campaigns, many receiving prison sentences, making it Britain's largest protest group since the suffragettes – in terms of fines and the numbers sent to prison.  Typical actions include painting slogans on buildings owned by businesses, and other minor criminal damage. 

At the beginning of the 1970s Cymdeithas began to campaign for a Welsh-language radio and television service. Radio Cymru was established in 1977, but in 1979 the Conservative government under Margaret Thatcher announced that it would not keep its election promise to establish a separate Welsh-language television channel. Some protesters refused to buy television licences and others climbed up television masts and invaded television studios. The government reversed its position and a Welsh-language TV channel, S4C, was launched in 1982.

2000s 

On 24 July 2004 (five weeks after launching), Radio Carmarthenshire's studios in Narberth were invaded by eleven activists from the Welsh Language Society Cymdeithas yr Iaith Gymraeg. They were protesting against Radio Carmarthenshire's decision to limit the amount of its Welsh-language programming. The offices and studios were stormed during a live broadcast, taking Radio Carmarthenshire and Pembrokeshire off-air for fifteen minutes. According to Keri Jones (who later branded the members of the group as "terrorists"), his head of sales was injured, and needed hospital treatment for a fractured wrist sustained during the scuffles which ensued. Police arrested eleven activists, and subsequently released them pending further enquiries. The chair of the movement Steffan Cravos was later found not guilty of causing grievous bodily harm.

Cymdeithas claimed that 50% of the population in Carmarthenshire speak Welsh as a first language, but less than 5% of Radio Carmarthenshire's output was in Welsh. As a result of complaints and pressure from the society and individuals, the United Kingdom's broadcasting watchdog Ofcom issued Radio Carmarthenshire with a 'yellow card' warning in late 2004; any further claims of the station not conforming to its licence agreement would result in the station being severely reprimanded by Ofcom.

Response to the 2011 Census results 
Following the 2011 Census results, the group held a series of rallies across Wales. The society launched the "" (I want to live in Welsh) slogan at the same rally.

On 6 February 2013 and 4 July 2013, deputations of  met First Minister Carwyn Jones to press for urgent policy changes in light of the Census results.

In August 2013, the group wrote to the First Minister Carwyn Jones, giving him six months to state his intention to deliver six policy changes for the benefit of the language:
  (Welsh-medium Education for All)
  (Financial Fairness for the Welsh language)
   (Internal Government in Welsh)
  (Language Standards to Create Clear Rights)
  (A Planning System for the benefit of our Communities)
  (Welsh as central to Sustainable Development)

Carwyn Jones had made no such statement of intent by 1 February 2014, and the group started a direct action campaign and held a series of protests across the country.

Ongoing campaigns 

 In 2015 Cymdeithas began calling for Welsh medium education to be extended to every school pupil in Wales, to 'give them the ability to communicate and work' in the language. This call was supported by the linguist David Crystal and academic Christine James. These calls include a call for an Education Act for Welsh language education for all.
 Sustainable communities; a property act to help tackle the housing crisis and second home issue.
 The devolution of broadcasting to Wales.

Successful campaigns 

According to the language group's website, its campaigns have contributed to securing the following policy changes for the language:

1960s – Bilingual road signs
1970s – Welsh-language television channel campaign and establishment of S4C, the world's only Welsh-language television channel, in 1982.
1993 – Welsh Language Act 1993 enacted, requiring public bodies to offer limited Welsh-language services
2000s – Campaign for new Welsh Language Act and official status for the language under the Welsh Language (Wales) Measure 2011
2011 – Welsh-medium higher education college, established

Campaign areas 

The principal campaigns can be divided into four major areas:

(Rights to the Welsh language) 

At the beginning of the 21st century,  started a campaign for a new Welsh Language Act. The Welsh Language Act 1993 declared that Welsh should be treated on an equal basis with English, but  argued that this fell short of what is needed.

In 2007, the society published its own Welsh Language Measure, draft legislation which would amongst other things establish official status for the Welsh language and rights to use it, and establish the office of the Welsh Language Commissioner.

In 2011, based in large part on 's proposals, the Welsh National Assembly passed the Welsh Language Measure (Wales) 2011, which established the Welsh language as an official language of Wales, and introduced the Welsh Language Commissioner.

(Sustainable Communities) 

This group leads on a number of matters, including housing and planning policy. Since the 1980s the group has called for a Property Act to increase the number of communities where Welsh is the main language of the area as well as tackling income inequality and environmental problems.

On 11 March 2014, the group published its own draft "Property and Planning Bill for the benefit of our communities (Wales) 2014" which would enshrine the six main principles of its proposal for a Property Act as well as establishing the Welsh language as a statutory material consideration in the planning system.

(Digital Future) 

This group campaigns for rights to see and hear the language.

(Education Group) 

Welsh medium education is available in most areas of Wales in the primary and secondary stages of school education. Welsh second-language GCSEs are compulsory in English medium education. This group demands improvements and also massive expansion in further (college) and higher (university) education. This mainly includes a Welsh language federal college, which would be a multi-sited college that provides courses and resources in the medium of Welsh.

Current volunteers and staff 
Current board of movement-
Chair-  Robat Idris

Vice-chairperson of campaigns- Ifan Jones

Vice-chairperson of communication-  Osian Rhys

Vice-chairperson of administrative duties-   Mai Roberts

Treasurer-   Danny Grehan

Officer of raising money and Membership-   Bethan Ruth

Officer of commercial and goods-   Mirain Owen

Officer of Digital-   Llinos Anwyl

Officer of design-   Carwyn Hedd

Editor of y tafod-   Mared Llywelyn Williams

Officer of learners - Heledd Owen

International deputy-   Joseff Gnagbo

Chair of education-  Mabli Siriol

Vice-chairperson of education-

Chair of the Sustainable Communities Group-   Jeff Smith

Vice-chairperson of the Sustainable Communities Group-

Chair of the Digital Futures Group-   Carl Morris

Vice-chairperson of the Digital Futures Group-   Mirain Owen

Chair of Right to the Welsh Language - Aled Powell

Vice-chairperson of Right to the Welsh Language

Chair of Health and Well Being Group-   Gwerfyl Roberts

Cymdeithas is a largely voluntary movement, which also employs five full-time members of staff, one at its head office in Aberystwyth, Ceredigion, one in its Caernarfon office, two in its Cardiff office and one in the Llanfihangel-ar-Arth office.

List of chairpersons

 1962–1963 – Tedi Millward and John Davies (secretaries)
 1963–1965 – John Daniel
 1965–1966 – Cynog Dafis
 1966–1967 – Emyr Llywelyn first and then Gareth Miles
 1967–1968 – Gareth Miles
 1968–1971 – Dafydd Iwan
 1971–1973 – Gronw ab Islwyn
 1973–1974 – Emyr Hywel
 1974–1975 – Ffred Ffransis
 1975–1977 – Wynfford James
 1977–1979 – Rhodri Williams
 1979–1981 – Wayne Williams
 1981–1982 – Meri Huws
 1982–1984 – Angharad Tomos
 1984–1985 – Karl Davies
 1985–1987 – Toni Schiavone
 1987–1989 – Helen Prosser
 1989–1990 – Sian Howys
 1990–1993 – Alun Llwyd
 1993–1994 – Aled Davies
 1994–1996 – Rocet Arwel Jones
 1996–1998 – Gareth Kiff
 1998–1999 – Branwen Niclas
 1999–2001 –
 2001–2002 – Branwen Brian Evans and Aled Davies (co-chairs)
 2002–2004 – Huw Lewis
 2004–2006 – Steffan Cravos
 2006–2007 – Steffan Cravos
 2007–2008 – Hywel Griffiths
 2008–2010 – Menna Machreth
 2010–2013 – Bethan Williams
 2013–2014 – Robin Farrar
 2014–2016 – Jamie Bevan
 2016–2018 – Heledd Gwyndaf
 2018–2019 – Osian Rhys
 2019–2020 – Bethan Ruth
 2020–2022– Mabli Siriol
 2022–present– Robat Idris

Notable members, former members and supporters 

John Davies
Tedi Millward
Gareth Miles
Meic Stephens
Owain Owain
Emyr Llewelyn
Ned Thomas
Meredydd Evans
Pennar Davies
Eirian Llwyd
R. Tudur Jones
Bobi Jones
Ffred Ffransis
Meinir Ffransis
Meirion Pennar
Meri Huws
Steve Eaves
Bryn Fôn
Steffan Cravos
Gwenno Teifi
Jamie Bevan

See also
 List of movements in Wales
 Barn (Welsh magazine)
 , an equivalent campaign in Scotland, founded in 1981
 Dyfodol I'r Iaith
 Golwg
Records of the Welsh Language Society at the National Library of Wales

Further reading
 Dafydd Iwan and Arfon Gwylim interviewed by Rob Gibson, in Burnett, Ray (ed.), Calgacus 3, Spring 1976, pp. 18 – 21,

References

External links
 Cymdeithas yr Iaith website 
 Cymdeithas yr Iaith website 
 Documents on the founding of the Society 

Welsh nationalism
Society
Political advocacy groups in Wales
Organizations established in 1962
1962 establishments in Wales
Celtic language advocacy organizations
Campaigns and movements in Wales